The U.S. state of Connecticut has fourteen active lighthouses in the state, two of which are maintained as private aids; six are standing but inactive. Another was destroyed after its deactivation. The earliest lighthouse in the state was erected in 1760, but that tower, the first New London Harbor Light, was replaced in 1801, and its successor is the oldest surviving light in Connecticut, as well as the tallest. The last officially recognized lighthouse in the state, the Avery Point Light, was constructed in 1943, but was not lit until the following year. The Mystic Seaport Light, constructed in 1966, is a functioning replica housed with a historic Fresnel lens; it is classified as an unofficial and non-navigational aid.

Notes

References 

Connecticut
 
Lighthouses
Lighthouses